Carla Suárez Navarro was the defending champion, but withdrew before the tournament due to a right shoulder injury.

Karolína Plíšková won the title, defeating Caroline Wozniacki in the final, 6–3 6–4.

Seeds
The top four seeds received a bye into the second round.

Draw

Finals

Top half

Bottom half

Qualifying

Seeds

Qualifiers

Draw

First qualifier

Second qualifier

Third qualifier

Fourth qualifier

References
Main Draw
Qualifying Draw

2017 WTA Tour
2017,Singles
2017 in Qatari sport